Eliquate is an alternative hip hop band formed in 2009 in Santa Cruz, California.

History
Eliquate was formed in 2019 by frontman Elliot Wright when a friend introduced him to guitarist Jamie Schnetzler. Over the next year, bass guitarist Cosmo Stevens, drummer Dan Wells and keyboard player Tanner Christiansen were added to the group. In 2010, Eliquate released their first album, Arch Rhythm. This was followed by an EP, Who the F*#K is Eliquate?, in 2011. They then released a second album, The Chalkboard's War Against Erasers in 2014.

Eliquate has performed with Murs, Del the Funky Homosapien, Zion-I, RJD2 and Sage Francis.

Personnel
Elliot Wright - lead vocals 
Jamie Schnetzler - lead guitar, backing vocals 
Daniel Wells - drums, backing vocals 
Cosmo Stevens - bass guitar, backing vocals 
Tanner Christansen - keyboard, samples, monome

Reactions
Mat Weir, writing on SanatCruz.com, said of A Chalkboard’s War Against Erasers, "One wouldn’t expect a hip-hop/funk/rock album by a bunch of post-college 20-somethings from the Digital Generation to be a mind-teaser about the philosophy of syntax, literature, perseverance and the moments of self-deprecation before the inner Phoenix rises again."

Discography
 Arch Rhythm (2010)
 Who the F*#K is Eliquate? EP (2011)
 "A Chalkboard's War Against Erasers" album (2013)

References

External links

Hip hop groups from California
Musical groups established in 2009
Alternative hip hop groups
Musicians from Santa Cruz, California